Finishing the Game is a 2007 mockumentary film directed by Justin Lin focusing on Bruce Lee's final movie Game of Death (1972), which was unfinished at the time of his death. Shot in 18 days,Finishing the Game comically satirizes the 1972 production—which used body doubles and clips from other Lee movies—and addresses racial stereotypes on the Asian community.

Its world premiere took place at the 2007 Sundance Film Festival, where it was an Official Selection. It was also selected as the opening night film at the 25th San Francisco International Asian American Film Festival.

Cast
McCaleb Burnett as Tarrick Tyler
Monique Gabriela Curnen
Roger Fan as Breeze Loo
Sung Kang as Colgate "Cole" Kim
Mousa Kraish as Raja
Meredith Scott Lynn as Eloise
Dustin Nguyen as Troy Poon
James Franco as Dean Silo
MC Hammer as Roy Thunder
Ron Jeremy as Peter Dowd
Brian Tee as Mac Chang
Leonardo Nam as Eli
George Takei as Man in Black
SuChin Pak as Connie Popavich-Mosimoto
Bella Thorne as Sue
Sam Bottoms as Martey Kurtainbaum
Jake Sandvig as Ronney Kurtainbaum
Michael Shamus Wiles as Officer Williams
Nathan Jung as Bob
Wilmer Calderon as Cesar (deleted scenes only)
Cassidy Freeman as Shirley
Joseph McQueen as Leroy/Earl
David Collard as Victor

Reception
Finishing the Game received mostly negative reviews from critics. On review aggregator website Rotten Tomatoes, the film has an approval rating of 34% based on 35 reviews, with an average rating of 4.8/10. The site's consensus reads, "Though Justin Lin's premise is precocious enough, the sight gags and comic timing are tired in this mockumentary about Asian typecasting in the 1970s." On Metacritic, the film has a score of 46 out of 100, based on 10 critics, indicating "mixed or average reviews".

References

External links
  Trek.fm review of the movie 

2007 films
2007 comedy films
Comedy films about Asian Americans
Films about Chinese Americans
Films about Taiwanese Americans
Films scored by Brian Tyler
Films directed by Justin Lin
American mockumentary films
2000s English-language films
2000s American films